Mount Lagado is a mountain rising to about  on the south side of Leppard Glacier, west of Target Hill, on Oscar II Coast, Graham Land, Antarctica. In association with names from Jonathan Swift's Gulliver's Travels grouped in this area, it was named by the UK Antarctic Place-Names Committee in 1988 after Lagado, the capital of the flying island of Laputa.

References

Mountains of Graham Land
Oscar II Coast